Fineyevo is a rural locality (a village) in Pershinskoye Rural Settlement, Kirzhachsky District, Vladimir Oblast, Russia. The population was 58 as of 2010. There are 21 streets.

Geography 
Fineyevo is located 15 km south of Kirzhach (the district's administrative centre) by road. Starovo is the nearest rural locality.

References 

Rural localities in Kirzhachsky District